Max Bing (15 March 1885 – 7 February 1945) was a German actor and director of radio plays.

Biography
Bing was born in Dresden. He received his first theatrical engagement in 1903 at the Ducal Meiningen Court Theatre, Meiningen (Herzogliches Hoftheater Meiningen or Meininger Theater). After that he performed in, among other places, Düsseldorf, Vienna, Brno, Stuttgart and Berlin. During his time in Vienna he appeared in the two early Austrian silent films Die Glückspuppe and Der Müller und sein Kind. but afterwards appeared only occasionally in front of the camera in Germany. On 10 October 1917 he was awarded the Charlottenkreuz.

From 1927 he concentrated on his work as a director and narrator in the Funk-Stunde Berlin (Berlin Radio), where among other things he produced in 1930 Die Geschichte vom Franz Biberkopf with Heinrich George in the leading role.

On 1 October 1942 Bing took on a new position as artistic director of the Tobis Film Company. He died on 7 February 1945 in Jauernig in the Sudetenland (now Javorník in the Czech Republic).

Filmography

Sources and external links

Notes

1885 births
1945 deaths
Actors from Dresden
German male stage actors
German male film actors
German male silent film actors
German radio producers
20th-century German male actors